Aznavour 65 is the sixteenth French studio album by the French-Armenian singer Charles Aznavour, released in 1965. According to Allmusic, the album captures "one of French pop's best singers at the height of his talent". In 1965 The New Yorker called it Aznavour's most exciting album.

The album includes songs by Charles Aznavour, Maurice Jarre and others. Many of the songs, including Je Ne Crois Pas, Une Enfant, Isabelle and C'Est Fini became international hits.

It was reissued in 1996 by EMI.

Track listing 
 Le Toréador (Charles Aznavour)
Je te réchaufferai (Charles Aznavour)
Reste (Charles Aznavour)
Que Dieu me garde (Charles Aznavour / Jeff Davis)
Isabelle (Charles Aznavour)
Le monde est sous nos pas (Charles Aznavour / Maurice Jarre)
Je ne crois pas (Charles Aznavour)
Les Filles d'aujourd'hui (Charles Aznavour)
C'est fini (Charles Aznavour)
Le Repos de la guerrière (Charles Aznavour / Françoise Dorin)
Au printemps tu reviendras (Charles Aznavour)
Sophie (Charles Aznavour / Jacques Plante)

Track listing of the 1995 CD Reissue 
 Le Toréador (Charles Aznavour)
Je Te Réchaufferai (Charles Aznavour)
Reste (Charles Aznavour)
Que Dieu Me Garde (Charles Aznavour / Jeff Davis)
Isabelle (Charles Aznavour)
Le Monde Est Sous Nos Pas (Charles Aznavour / Maurice Jarre)
Je Ne Crois Pas (Charles Aznavour)
Les Filles d'Aujourd'hui (Charles Aznavour)
C'Est Fini (Charles Aznavour)
Le Repos de la Guerrière (Charles Aznavour / Françoise Dorin)
Au Printemps Tu Reviendras (Charles Aznavour)
Sophie (Charles Aznavour / Jacques Plante)
A T'Regarder (Charles Aznavour / Jean Constantin)
Après L'Amour (Charles Aznavour)
Une Enfant (Charles Aznavour / Robert Chauvigny)
Heureux Avec des Riens (Charles Aznavour / Jeff Davis)
A Tout Jamais (Charles Aznavour)
Liberté (Charles Aznavour / Maurice Vidalin)

Personnel 
Charles Aznavour - Author, Composer, Vocals
 Eddie Barclay - Orchestration
 Robert Chauvigny - Composer
Jean Constantin - Composer
Jeff Davis - Composer
Nuit de Chine - Design
Françoise Dorin - Composer
Andre Gornet - Photography
Maurice Jarre - Composer
Herman Leonard - Photography
Paul Mauriat - Orchestration
Jacques Plante - Composer
Lévon Sayan - Artistic Consultation
Maurice Vidalin - Composer

References

Links
Reste by Aznavour (live)
Aznavour 65 at discogs.com

1965 albums
Charles Aznavour albums